
Gmina Nysa is an urban-rural gmina (administrative district) in Nysa County, Opole Voivodeship, in south-western Poland.

Villages
Apart from the town of Nysa, Gmina Nysa contains the villages and settlements of Biała Nyska, Domaszkowice, Głębinów, Goświnowice, Hajduki Nyskie, Hanuszów, Iława, Jędrzychów, Kępnica, Konradowa, Koperniki, Kubice, Lipowa, Morów, Niwnica, Podkamień, Przełęk, Radzikowice, Regulice, Rusocin, Sękowice, Siestrzechowice, Skorochów, Wierzbięcice, Wyszków Śląski and Złotogłowice.

Neighbouring gminas
Gmina Nysa is bordered by the gminas of Głuchołazy, Korfantów, Łambinowice, Otmuchów, Pakosławice and Prudnik.

Twin towns – sister cities

Gmina Nysa is twinned with:

 Batumi, Georgia
 Ingelheim am Rhein, Germany
 Jeseník, Czech Republic
 Kolomyia, Ukraine
 Lüdinghausen, Germany
 Šumperk, Czech Republic
 Taverny, France
 Ternopil, Ukraine

References

Nysa
Nysa County